The 1964 Preakness Stakes was the 89th running of the $200,000 Preakness Stakes thoroughbred horse race. The race took place on May 16, 1964, and was televised in the United States on the CBS television network. Northern Dancer, who was jockeyed by Bill Hartack, won the race by two and one quarter lengths over runner-up The Scoundrel. Approximate post time was 5:47 p.m. Eastern Time. The race was run on a fast track in a final time of 1:56-4/5.  The Maryland Jockey Club reported total attendance of 35,975, this is recorded as second highest on the list of American thoroughbred racing top attended events for North America in 1964.

Payout 

The 89th Preakness Stakes Payout Schedule

The full chart 

 Winning Breeder: E. P. Taylor; (CAN)
 Winning Time: 1:56 4/5
 Track Condition: Fast
 Total Attendance: 35,975

References

External links 
 

1964
1964 in horse racing
1964 in American sports
1964 in sports in Maryland
Horse races in Maryland